The Roman Catholic Diocese of Sibu is the ecclesiastical territory of the Latin Church or the diocese of the Catholic Church in the state of Sarawak, Malaysia. It is headquartered in Sibu and covered the divisions of Sibu, Mukah, Sarikei, and Kapit. 

Erected in 1986 by Pope John Paul II and first led by Dominic Su Haw Chiu, this diocese is a suffragan diocese in the ecclesiastical province of the metropolitan Archdiocese of Kuching. The diocesan cathedral is the Sacred Heart Cathedral in Sibu. The current Bishop of Sibu is Joseph Hii Teck Kwong, having been installed in 2012.

History

The Sibu Catholic Mission started in 1899 when Fr. Cornelius Keet first arrived. A small hut was built for the priest to stay on his travels to Bintangor and Sare (Sarikei). Although it was only a short stay, he managed to convert a few hundred people to the Catholic faith before he was recalled to Kuching.

Fr. Vincent Halder arrived Sibu in 1906. He built the old Sacred Heart Church on stilts which served the Catholic community until 1954. Fr. Halder is described as a most lovable character. He was extremely well liked by his boys and by all the people in Sibu. A new convent school was opened in 1929 and 13 churches were built in the lower Rejang area as the Mission was called. Fr. Halder left for Europe on 1 March 1931 and on his return, he fell ill and died in Singapore on 16 August 1936 at the age of 57. The Catholics from Sibu had his body brought back and he was buried in the mission compound. When his body was exhumed 28 years later to make way for development, it was found to be incorrupt, so he was given a second funeral around Sibu town.

Fr. Keet returned to Sibu and was assisted by Fr. Aloysius Hopfgartner. This was the first push in the Rejang District towards work among the Chinese. Education was of primary concern. Fr. Hopfgartner founded the Sacred Heart School and became its principal until he was transferred to Sandakan in 1908.

Fr. William van Odijk took over from Fr. Halder and the mission continued to flourish, looking also after the Lower Rejang area. Since 1910 Sibu is mentioned as a separate mission. Fr. Odijk died in 1936, aged 55.

Fr John Vos arrived and was mainly involved in school work. His stay in Sibu was short before moving to Kuching. He was succeeded by Fr James Buis in 1938. As the Sacred Heart School grew, priests like Fr. Thomas Delaney (1933–1937), Fr. William Wagenaar (1935–1938), Fr. Gerard Bruggeman (1937–1940), Fr. Francis Hulsbosch (1938–1939), Fr. John Dekker (1940–1942) were assigned to take up teaching posts. Besides school work they were also engaged in pastoral work.

In May 1942, the European priests were interned by the Japanese at Batu Lintang camp, Kuching. Fr. Joseph Chin was the only remaining local priest in the whole of the Rejang region, and had to go underground to carry out his priestly duties. He went house to house offering Mass secretly. Twice he was caught and was flogged and jailed. He was highly esteemed by all who know him. He was the builder of St Mary's church and was its first Priest (1967–1968). He died of cancer in 1969.

The Japanese surrendered in 1945. The interned priests were flown from Kuching to Labuan in September to recuperate for a short time. It was decided that some priests would go to Europe for long leave, others would start to re-open the mission stations. Fr. Buis returned to Sibu. So the mission revived and continued to flourish. Fr. Dekker revived the Sacred Heart School at the end of 1945. In a couple of years the schools and mission were back to a healthy growth. Fr. John Maher came in 1946 and taught for 5 years in Sacred Heart School.

Fr. James Buis was appointed Prefect for North Borneo (now Sabah) on 18 January 1947. Frs. John Dekker and William Wagenaar were appointed acting rectors during 1947-1950. During those years Fr. Clement Epping and Charles Reiterer arrived at Sibu to perform pastoral and educational work.
                     
Fr. Adrian de Vos became the new rector of Sibu Mission in January 1950. He also became the principal of Sacred Heart School which by this time had  600 students. In 1954 the Mill Hill Fathers realised they could not cope with their missionary work and the school as well, so they invited De La Salle Brothers to take over the running of Sacred Heart School. Brother Fridolin became the principal.

Fr. Dominic Su was ordained by Pope John Paul II (now Saint) as Bishop of Sibu on 6 January 1987 in St. Peter's Basilica, Vatican, Rome. Sibu became a new diocese.  Fr. David Bingham has worked hard for 14 years mostly in the Selangau area. Selangau mission has undergone a lot of development, not only in buildings but also the stations of the cross on the hill slope. Fr. William Bos served Sibu Mission in looking after the Than Catholics in town, along the Oya and Igan. He served the diocese as Vicar General from 1987. BEC was established in Sibu on 27 July 1987. They were divided into 5 zones. On 28 May 1991, deacon Joseph Sebastian of Kampung Tellian become the first Melanau to be ordained priest at the old Sts. Peter and Paul Church in Mukah. In 2008, Pope Benedict XVI (now Pope Emeritus) appointed Fr. Joseph Hii as Auxiliary Bishop of Sibu. He was ordained in May 2008 and installed as bishop of Sibu in February 2012.

Bishops
The lists of the bishops and auxiliary bishop of the diocese and their years of service:

Bishops of the Diocese of Sibu
 Dominic Su Haw Chiu (1987–2011)
 Joseph Hii Teck Kwong (2012–present)

Former auxiliary bishop
 Joseph Hii Teck Kwong (2008–2012), appointed Bishop of this diocese

Parishes

References

See also
 Catholic Church in Malaysia
 List of Catholic dioceses in Malaysia, Singapore and Brunei
 List of Catholic dioceses (structured view)-Episcopal Conference of Malaysia, Singapore and Brunei

Sibu
Christian organizations established in 1986
Roman Catholic dioceses and prelatures established in the 20th century
1986 establishments in Malaysia